Orlando Calixte (born February 3, 1992) is a Dominican professional baseball outfielder and shortstop for the Chunichi Dragons of Nippon Professional Baseball. He has played in Major League Baseball (MLB) for the Kansas City Royals and San Francisco Giants.

Background
Calixte was born in Santo Domingo, Dominican Republic to parents born in Haiti. His father Dieudonne, emigrated to the Dominican Republic in 1977; obtained legal status and had several other children who also pursued baseball.

Career

Kansas City Royals
Calixte was signed by the Kansas City Royals as an international free agent in August 2010. He made his professional debut that season with the Dominican Summer League Royals. He played 2011 with the Kane County Cougars and 2012 with Kane County and Wilmington Blue Rocks. In 2013 and 2014 he played for the Double-A Northwest Arkansas Naturals.

Calixte began the 2015 season with the Omaha Storm Chasers of the Class AAA Pacific Coast League. They promoted him to the major leagues on April 19.

On December 2, 2015, the Royals decided to non-tender Calixte. The following day, they signed him to a minor league contract.

San Francisco Giants
On November 14, 2016, Calixte signed a minor league deal with the San Francisco Giants. The Giants added him to their 40-man roster a few days later. He was called up to make his Giants debut against the Washington Nationals on May 30, 2017. In his first at bat of the 2017 season, he recorded his first career hit, a single to shallow center. In his second at bat, he hit a two-RBI double down the left field line. Calixte was optioned back down to the minors on June 9, 2017. He became a free agent after the 2018 season.

Seattle Mariners
On November 19, 2018, Calixte signed a minor league deal with the Seattle Mariners. He became a free agent following the season on November 4, 2019.

New York Mets
On April 19, 2021, Calixte signed with the York Revolution of the Atlantic League of Professional Baseball. On May 24, before the start of the ALPB season, Calixte’s contract was purchased by the New York Mets organization and he was assigned to the Triple-A Syracuse Mets. Calixte played in 64 games for Syracuse, hitting .235 with 2 home runs and 24 RBI's. On September 17, 2021, the Mets released Calixte.

Sultanes de Monterrey
On January 27, 2022, Calixte signed with the Sultanes de Monterrey of the Mexican League.

Chunichi Dragons
On 22 November, 2022, it was reported Calixte had signed with the Chunichi Dragons of Nippon Professional Baseball.

References

External links

1992 births
Living people
Águilas Cibaeñas players
Chunichi Dragons players
Dominican Republic expatriate baseball players in Japan
Dominican Republic expatriate baseball players in the United States
Dominican Republic people of Haitian descent
Dominican Summer League Royals players
Estrellas Orientales players
Kane County Cougars players
Kansas City Royals players
Major League Baseball outfielders
Major League Baseball players from the Dominican Republic
Major League Baseball shortstops
Northwest Arkansas Naturals players
Omaha Storm Chasers players
Peoria Javelinas players
Sacramento River Cats players
San Francisco Giants players
Sportspeople from Santo Domingo
Surprise Saguaros players
Syracuse Mets players
Tacoma Rainiers players
Wilmington Blue Rocks players